Limbo is a programming language for writing distributed systems and is the language used to write applications for the Inferno operating system. It was designed at Bell Labs by Sean Dorward, Phil Winterbottom, and Rob Pike.

The Limbo compiler generates architecture-independent object code which is then interpreted by the Dis virtual machine or compiled just before runtime to improve performance. Therefore all Limbo applications are completely portable across all Inferno platforms.

Limbo's approach to concurrency was inspired by Hoare's communicating sequential processes (CSP), as implemented and amended in Pike's earlier Newsqueak language and Winterbottom's Alef.

Language features
Limbo supports the following features:
 modular programming
 concurrent programming
 strong type checking at compile and run-time
 interprocess communication over typed channels
 automatic garbage collection
 simple abstract data types

Virtual machine
The Dis virtual machine that executes Limbo code is a CISC-like VM, with instructions for arithmetic, control flow, data motion, process creation, synchronizing and communicating between processes, loading modules of code, and support for higher-level data-types: strings, arrays, lists, and communication channels. It uses a hybrid of reference counting and a real-time garbage-collector for cyclic data.

Aspects of the design of Dis were inspired by the AT&T Hobbit microprocessor, as used in the original BeBox.

Examples
Limbo uses Ada-style definitions as in:

 name := type value;
 name0,name1 : type = value;
 name2,name3 : type;
 name2 = value;

Hello world 
 implement Command;
 
 include "sys.m";
     sys: Sys;
 
 include "draw.m";

 include "sh.m";
 
 init(nil: ref Draw->Context, nil: list of string)
 {
     sys = load Sys Sys->PATH;
     sys->print("Hello World!\n");
 }

Books 
The 3rd edition of the Inferno operating system and Limbo programming language are described in the textbook Inferno Programming with Limbo   (Chichester: John Wiley & Sons, 2003), by Phillip Stanley-Marbell.  Another textbook The Inferno Programming Book: An Introduction to Programming for the Inferno Distributed System, by  Martin Atkins, Charles Forsyth, Rob Pike and Howard Trickey, was started, but never released.

See also 

 The Inferno operating system
 Alef, the predecessor of Limbo
 Plan 9 from Bell Labs
 Go (programming language), similar language from Google
 AT&T Hobbit, a processor architecture which inspired the Dis VM

References

External links
 Vita Nuova page on Limbo
 A Descent into Limbo by Brian Kernighan
 The Limbo Programming Language by Dennis M. Ritchie and Addendum by Vita Nuova.
 Inferno Programming with Limbo by Phillip Stanley-Marbell
 Threaded programming in the Bell Labs CSP style
 
 .
 .
 .

C programming language family
Concurrent programming languages
Free compilers and interpreters
Inferno (operating system)
Virtual machines